Manuela Malsiner (born 15 December 1997) is an Italian ski jumper. She has competed at World Cup level since the 2012/13 season, with her best individual result being second place in Zaō on 20 January 2017. At the 2017 Junior World Championships in Park City, she won an individual gold medal in the normal hill competition.

Her younger sister is Lara Malsiner, who also competes in the World Cup.

References

1997 births
Living people
Sportspeople from Sterzing
Italian female ski jumpers
Ski jumpers at the 2018 Winter Olympics
Olympic ski jumpers of Italy